Mark Steadman (July 2, 1930 - 6 February 2020) was an American novelist from Statesboro, Georgia. He taught at Clemson University in South Carolina.

Bibliography
McAfee County: A Chronicle (1971)
A Lion's Share (1976)
Angel Child (1987)
Bang-Up Season (1990)

References

Further reading

20th-century American novelists
2020 deaths
1930 births
American male novelists
Novelists from Georgia (U.S. state)
People from Statesboro, Georgia
Clemson University faculty
20th-century American male writers